Melanie Wight is a Canadian politician, who was elected to the Legislative Assembly of Manitoba in the 2011 election. She represented the electoral district of Burrows as a member of the Manitoba New Democratic Party caucus until 2016, when she was defeated in the 2016 election.

She served as the Minister of Children and Youth Opportunities from November 2014 until leaving office.

Electoral record

References

Women government ministers of Canada
Living people
Members of the Executive Council of Manitoba
New Democratic Party of Manitoba MLAs
Politicians from Winnipeg
Women MLAs in Manitoba
21st-century Canadian politicians
21st-century Canadian women politicians
Year of birth missing (living people)